The International Micropatrological Society (IMS) was an American learned society and research institute dedicated to the study of micronations. Founded in 1973 by Frederick W. Lehmann IV of St. Louis, Michigan, the IMS coined micropatrology as the study of micronations and micronationalism. It had documented 128 micronations and similar political entities by 1976.

The IMS assessed the legitimacy of micronational claims in five categories—B ("bogus"), E ("extinct"), F ("fiction"), T ("traditional") and O ("other"); according to the IMS, only micronations rated T or O had good chances of achieving independence. Owned by Lehmann and Christopher Martin, the IMS had offices in St. Louis, Michigan and King's Lynn, Norfolk, England. According to the Yearbook of International Organizations, the IMS was disestablished in 1988.

History 
The IMS was founded in 1973 by Frederick W. Lehmann IV of St. Louis, Michigan. In 1977, documents from the IMS supposedly supporting the legitimacy of the Most Serene Federal Republic of Montmartre were used in a court case by Montmartre President Barry Alan Richmond to advocate for the micronation's inclusion in the phone directory of the Bell System. The IMS contributed its research to Erwin Strauss's 1979 How to Start Your Own Country about micronations. According to the Yearbook of International Organizations, the IMS was disestablished in 1988.

Aftermath 
In 1996, Swiss author Fabrice O'Driscoll of Aix-Marseille University founded the French Institute of Micropatrology as an unofficial continuation of the IMS. In 2000, O'Driscoll wrote the book Ils ne siègent pas à l'ONU: revue de quelques micro-Etats, micro-nations et autres entités éphémères (They don't sit at the UN: a review of some micro-states, micro-nations and other ephemeral entities), which details over 600 micronations.

References

Sources 

Micronational culture
Organizations established in 1973
1973 establishments in Michigan
Organizations disestablished in 1988
1988 disestablishments in Michigan
1988 disestablishments in England